Fausto Coppola (born 29 April 1997) is an Italian football player.

Club career
He made his Serie B debut for Virtus Entella on 9 April 2016 in a game against Virtus Lanciano.

On 31 January 2019, he signed with Viterbese.
From 21 January 2020, he play with Avezzano Calcio in serie D.

References

External links
 

1997 births
Footballers from Naples
Living people
Italian footballers
Virtus Entella players
S.S. Akragas Città dei Templi players
U.C. AlbinoLeffe players
U.S. Viterbese 1908 players
Avezzano Calcio players
Serie B players
Serie C players
Association football midfielders